Where My Heart Is is the second studio album by American American country music artist Ronnie Milsap. It was released in 1973 by RCA Records. It was Milsap's first album to chart, peaking at #5 on country album charts, and was his first to produce singles. The tracks "I Hate You" and "(All Together Now) Let's Fall Apart" both reached the top ten on country charts and the song "That Girl Who Waits on Tables" peaked at #11.

Track listing

Charts

Weekly charts

Singles

References

Ronnie Milsap - Where My Heart Is RCA Victor Tracklist, letssingit.com.

1973 albums
Ronnie Milsap albums
RCA Records albums
Albums produced by Tom Collins (record producer)